Võiardi   is a village in Räpina Parish, Põlva County in southeastern Estonia.

References

 

Villages in Põlva County